Israel Berendt Melchior (12 May 1827 – 7 September 1893) was a Danish engineer, manufacturer and amateur photographer. He is remembered in particular for the photographs he took of Hans Christian Andersen.

Career

Born on 12 May 1827, Melchior was educated as a civil engineer. In 1874, he bought the Valdemarshaab paper factory, just north of Køge, for 60,000 kroner after it had been declared bankrupt as a result of a flood in 1872. By 1875, he had completely renovated the plant and in addition had built Søvang, a large, Italian-styled director's residence, adjacent to the factory. However, the factory was totally destroyed by fire in October of the same year and was never rebuilt. Melchior lived in the magnificent villa from 1875 to 1884 together with his wife (and cousin) Johanne Melchior (1848–1911) with whom he had four children. They were an extremely sociable couple who entertained frequently, sometimes arranging soirées and even short plays in their home.

Amateur photographer

Melchior was a keen amateur photographer. When he built Søvang, he had the upper floor specially designed to accommodate a large photographic studio with an overhead window as well as a glass wall facing east. In particular, he photographed the annual family gatherings at Rolighed, the family mansion on Østerbro just outside Copenhagen. A number of artists and authors would also take part in the gatherings, the most famous being Hans Christian Andersen who got to know the family in 1862 and was a frequent visitor until he died there in 1875. Melchior took a number of photographs of family groups together with Andersen from 1867, as well as some portraits.

Gallery

References

External links 
 Source
 Interior photographs by Melchior

1827 births
1893 deaths
Danish Jews
19th-century Danish businesspeople
19th-century Danish photographers
Danish photographers
Pioneers of photography
Hans Christian Andersen